"A Teenager in Love" is a song written by Doc Pomus and partner Mort Shuman. It was originally recorded by Dion and the Belmonts, and released in March 1959. It appeared on their album Presenting Dion and the Belmonts (1959). It reached number 5 on the Billboard pop charts.

The song was covered by many different artists; in 1959, three different versions of the song charted simultaneously in the UK, the other two versions being by Marty Wilde and Craig Douglas, which reached No. 2 and No. 13 respectively on the British chart.

Background
The song was written by the songwriting duo Doc Pomus and Mort Shuman commissioned by Laurie Records, originally intended for the doo-wop singing group The Mystics. Laurie Records, however, gave the song to Dion & The Belmonts instead to record, and Pomus and Shuman then quickly wrote another song, "Hushabye" for the Mystics. Dion initially thought the song sounded "wimpy", but then realized the sound the song has when the Belmonts starting singing "ooh-wah" at the start of the song. "A Teenager in Love" was released with "I've Cried Before" its B-side in April 1959, and peaked at No. 5 in May.

The song has appeared on multiple "best of" compilation albums by Dion and the Belmonts.

Charts

Parodies 
The Fugs parodied "A Teenager In Love" as "Septuagenarian in Love" on The Fugs Final CD Part 1. This version turns the teenager into a senior citizen who is having trouble getting an erection. The Four Preps parodied the song in "More Money for You and Me".

References

External links 
Songs by Doc Pomus

Songs about teenagers
1959 songs
1959 singles
Songs with lyrics by Doc Pomus
Songs with music by Mort Shuman
Dion DiMucci songs
The Fleetwoods songs
Helen Shapiro songs
The Muppets songs
Less Than Jake songs
Red Hot Chili Peppers songs
Laurie Records singles